The Next One is a science fiction film starring Keir Dullea and Adrienne Barbeau released in 1984, and directed by Nico Mastorakis.

Plot summary
The Next One is a film in which the recent-widow of an American astronaut finds Glen - a man with uncanny powers and castaway in space and time - washed up on the beach of her Greek Island retreat.

Reception
Colin Greenland reviewed The Next One for Imagine magazine, and stated that "An awkward movie, but a thoughtful attempt to connect ancient and modern mythology."

References

External link
IMDb

1984 films
Artificial wormholes in fiction